Bosea minatitlanensis is a Gram-negative, oxidase- and catalase-positive, strictly aerobic non-spore-forming motile bacteria from the genus of Bosea which was isolated from industrial waste water in Mexico.

References

External links
Type strain of Bosea minatitlanensis at BacDive -  the Bacterial Diversity Metadatabase

Hyphomicrobiales
Bacteria described in 2003